Quina Brook is a hamlet in north Shropshire, near the border between England and Wales. Population details for the 2011 census are found under Wem Rural.

Quina Brook was the final destination of an arm of the Ellesmere Canal. This arm was originally going to terminate at Prees. The arm is now known as the Press Branch of the Llangollen Canal, and is navigavable for about a mile to Whixall Marina, the following 3/4 mile is still followable on the towpath as it passes through Prees Branch Canal Nature Reserve.

See also
Listed buildings in Wem Rural

References

Villages in Shropshire